Arista Years may refer to:

The Arista Years (Grateful Dead album)
Arista Years   Gong (band) 
Arista Years by The Kinks
Arista Years 1975 - 2000 by Patti Smith
The Best Of The Arista Years by General Johnson